Kate Spade New York is an American fashion house founded in January 1993 by Kate and Andy Spade. Kate Spade New York competes with Michael Kors. In 2017, the company was purchased by Tapestry, Inc., formerly known as Coach, Inc.

Business history

Prior to company creation 
Katherine Noel Brosnahan (later known as Kate Spade) was born on December 24, 1962, in Kansas City, Missouri. She grew up in Kansas City and went to an all-girls Catholic high school. Eventually she moved to Arizona, where she attended Arizona State University and graduated in 1985. It is there that she met her future husband, Andy Spade. Katherine majored in journalism, while Andy majored in architecture.

In 1986, after completing their education, the couple moved to New York City. It was in New York that Katherine worked as a style editor for Mademoiselle, but left in 1991 (with the title of senior editor/head of accessories) to start her own handbag line. To get inspiration, Kate browsed local flea markets and secondhand stores. She also researched the styles, fabrics, and potential production costs of making her own handbags. The team slowly worked their way up the social ladder until they were able to create a company that would be noticed by the public.

Early stages 
Kate Spade New York was founded in 1993 by Katherine Noel Brosnahan and her husband/business partner Andy Spade. Kate Spade New York started after a suggestion from Andy when Katherine was unsure about her next career move after working six years at Mademoiselle. Originally, the business started out with the Sam handbag. Eventually, Andy withdrew $35,000 from his 401K account to fund the production of Katherine’s handbags. Her debut line infused classic shapes, colors, and fabrics into a now iconic square bag with a small black label sewn to the outside of the bag that said “Kate Spade New York.” Her main target market at this time was the upper middle class.

In 1996, Spade's company opened its first shop in New York City's SoHo neighborhood. Kate Spade rose in eight months after a journalist at Cleveland Research Co. recommended buying the shares because of the brand’s growth potential.

After 1998 the company began to expand, with sales totaling $27 million. In 1999, Neiman Marcus Group paid $34 million for a 56% stake of the company. In 2006 when Neiman Marcus Group acquired the remaining 44% stake in Kate Spade for $59.4 M, revenue was reportedly near $99 million. This acquisition valued the company at $134 million.

Later stages 
In 2004, Kate Spade operated only 13 stores in the United States, and did not ship out of the country (Cohen 198). The company initially sold handbags, but eventually extended to include stationery, personal organizers, address books, shoes, beauty products, perfume, raincoats, pajamas, eyewear, and clothing. It now has a full women's clothing line. The business’ clothing and handbag lines are featured in retail stores all across America. Products are easily and continuously shipped around the world. By 2004, Kate Spade & Co. was worth $70 million, not including the complementary company Jack Spade. Kate Spade has over 180 stores around the world, and is sold in more than 400 stores worldwide (Cohen 198). Kate and Andy went from taking “the nothing black bag” to a creative personalized purse, now they create merchandise from the simple tote to home decor and bedding.

In November 2006, apparel giant Liz Claiborne Inc. bought Kate Spade for $124 million from Neiman Marcus Group. Andy Spade was initially in charge of company operations, but, in 2007 after the sale of the company, operational control was turned over to Liz Claiborne. Kate Spade expanded their retail stores to include Kate Spade New York Outlets. The brand has over 47 outlet locations across the United States. The outlets offer Kate Spade New York handbags, clothing, jewelry, and accessories at a discounted price. Kate Spade New York Products are also sold in major department stores including Nordstrom, Macy's, and Dillard's. Kate Spade New York handbags, clothing, jewelry, accessories, and home products can be found in these major department stores. Kate Spade Home products are also sold at Bed, Bath and Beyond. As of January 2017, Kate Spade New York also debuted an exclusive collection with Williams Sonoma, including dinnerware, glassware, and flatware.

Tapestry, Inc. purchased Kate Spade & Company in July 2017 for $2.4 billion.

In June 2018, following the death of Kate Spade by suicide, Tapestry, Inc. announced a plan to donate $1 million towards mental health awareness, starting with a $250,000 donation to Crisis Text Line.

Company

Merchandise 

Kate Spade's first handbag was sold in January 1993. Shortly after the initial products were released, new collections came out containing glasses, jewelry, and other small accessories (winter 36). In 2007, "kate spade at home" was launched as a home collection brand. It features bedding, bath items, china, and various items for the home and wallpaper. In April 2013, Kate Spade New York launched a new fragrance called Live Colorfully. Previous perfumes of the house include Kate Spade from 2003 and Twirl from 2010. Live Colorfully is a fragrance made in-house that marks the 20th anniversary of the brand. Each of Spade's products sold are packaged, and each one has a card that gives a description of Kate and Andy's journey to the top.

Jack Spade 
Jack Spade was the complement to the Kate Spade brand for men. The brand operated as an independent business with its own visual identity, website, e-commerce platform, and physical stores for most of its twenty-three year run, Jack Spade was a line of furnishings for men. Jack Spade's product range included a full suite of furnishings for men best known for its bags, but also producing small leather goods (such as wallets, passport holders, coin purses, and phone cases), apparel (including all types of menswear), watches, and technology items. The retail stores in the US, UK, and Japan were designed by Steven Sclaroff, evoking "modern masculinity".

Bags for men 
Jack Spade bags catered to men.

Jack Spade bags are immediately identifiable by the brand label (or heat-embossed stamp) always placed in a corner of the bag. Original Jack Spade bags featured black cloth labels embroidered with "Jack Spade, Warren Street, New York" sewn onto a corner of a flap or panel. Newer bags feature "Jack Spade" heat-embossed or "Jack Spade, New York" on a cloth or leather patch. All Jack Spade bags include a cloth identification patch on the inside of the bag for the owner to fill out.

All Jack Spade bags were named by series. For example, one of the brand's staple items was the Wayne duffel, reinvented season after season in new materials.

Messenger bags 
Jack Spade was known for its many series of messenger bags. Often designed as a single-compartment leather bag, secured with a flap closure and two snaps.

Duffel bags 
Jack Spade's series of duffel bags for men are one of the most recognizable bags from the brand. Series such as "Wayne" and "Nolan" were constant staples in the brand's collections. The Wayne duffel came in a variety of materials, mostly leather, nylon, and canvas; and included a roomy interior, four metal feet, and a detachable shoulder strap.

Coal bags 
Jack Spade took inspiration from bags engineers used to carry coal in the 1920s and fashioned large tote bags for men out of a heavy duty industrial canvas. Over the years, these coal bags were updated and redesigned with design elements such as pops of color (or "dipped" color in Jack Spade vernacular), and remade in leather, suede, canvas, and nylon.

A special edition 20th Anniversary Coal Bag was designed in aged industrial canvas with "JACK" running down the right side of the front of the bag. These were available in both an aged blue canvas with white outline and a beige canvas with orange outline.

Wind down of Jack Spade 
All the Jack Spade stores were permanently closed in January 2015 following Kate Spade's acquisition by Tapestry (formerly the Coach Group) along with Kate Spade Saturday. This closure of brick and mortar locations prompted the transition away from "Jack Spade, Warren Street, New York" on the brands' iconic labels to simply, "Jack Spade" or "Jack Spade, New York". Notable locations included the Los Angeles boutique on Abbot Kinney in Venice, California, and the flagship boutique on Warren Street in New York City.

Jack Spade's separate and dedicated e-commerce platform went away in mid-2017, becoming a sixteen-item section titled “Gifts for him” on the Kate Spade website. A full product line with staples such as the Coal Bag, backpacks, wallets, small leather goods, and apparel was carried on Amazon throughout 2017, but as of June 2018, Amazon appears to not be restocking inventory, discounting items and allowing them to permanently sell out.

References

High fashion brands
2000s fashion
2010s fashion
2020s fashion
Bags (fashion)
Design companies established in 1993
Fashion accessory brands
Dinnerware designers
Eyewear brands of the United States
2017 mergers and acquisitions